Pesanggrahan is a district of South Jakarta one of the administrative cities which forms the capital territory of Jakarta, Indonesia. The Pesanggrahan River flows along the eastern edge of Pesanggrahan District. To the west of Pesanggrahan District is Tangerang and South Tangerang, Banten Province. 

Pesanggrahan District was originally part of the Kebayoran Lama District, which was later made into a separate district.

A southwestern portion of the Jakarta Outer Ring Road and the Serpong-Jakarta railway passed through Pesanggrahan District.

Toponym
The name Pesanggrahan is derived from the name of the river Pesanggrahan along the eastern edge of the district.

Kelurahan (Administrative villages)
The district of Pesanggrahan is divided into five administrative villages (kelurahan):
Ulujami - area code 12250
Petukangan Utara - area code 12260
Petukangan Selatan - area code 12270
Pesanggrahan - area code 12320
Bintaro - area code 12330

List of important places

Budi Luhur University
Darunnajah Islamic Boarding School
Metro Mall Cipulir 
Taman Swadharma

Reference

Districts of Jakarta
South Jakarta